Mocis dyndima is a species of moth of the family Erebidae. It is found in Belize, Costa Rica, Venezuela and Colombia.

References

Moths described in 1919
Mocis